Wodan Heerst is an EP by the Dutch pagan/ folk metal band Heidevolk. The first track is included on the band's following studio album, Walhalla Wacht. The second track is a remixed version of a song featured on Heidevolk's previous release, De Strijdlust is Geboren; it features more violin than the previous version. The third and final track is a cover of a song by the band Normaal. The lyrics can be read as a simple catechism of Wodan and his acts, mainly describing his quests for divine wisdom, interspersed with prayers to and praise of the god.

Track listing

References

2007 EPs
Heidevolk albums